Giulietta e Romeo (Juliet and Romeo) is an opera in two acts by the Italian composer Nicola Vaccai. The libretto, by Felice Romani, is based on the tragedy of the same name by Luigi Scevola and, ultimately, on the 1530 novella of the same name by Luigi Da Porto. It was first performed at the Teatro alla Canobbiana, Milan, on 31 October 1825. It was Vaccai's last major success, although he wrote another nine operas, and is rarely performed in its full version today.

The opera was also first performed in Barcelona on 26 May 1827, Paris on 11 September 1827, Lisbon in the autumn of 1828, London on 10 April 1832, and Mexico in July 1841. It was first performed in Graz (in a German translation by I. C. Kollmann) on 12 October 1833 and Budapest (also in Kollmann's translation) on 31 July 1845.

On 27 October 1832, during a performance of Bellini's I Capuleti e i Montecchi in Bologna, the next to last scene of Vaccai's opera was substituted for the last act of the Bellini opera. This was done at the request of the Romeo, Maria Malibran, and became frequent practice during the remainder of the 19th century. It was almost always done this way in Italy, and in this guise this portion of Vaccai's opera continued to be performed up to as late as 8 September 1897, when it was presented in this manner in Hamburg.

Roles

References
Notes

Sources
Loewenberg, Alfred (1978). Annals of Opera 1597–1940 (third edition, revised). Totowa, New Jersey: Rowman and Littlefield. .

Further reading
Del Teatro (in Italian)

External links

An engraving of the set 

1825 operas
Italian-language operas
Operas
Operas by Nicola Vaccai
Operas based on Romeo and Juliet
Libretti by Felice Romani